Club Hockey Gèu Vielha-Val d'Aran is an ice hockey club in Vielha e Mijaran, Catalonia. This Occitan team was playing in the Spanish League until 2007-08 season. Their home arena was the Palai de Gèu de Vielha.

History 
The club was founded in 2005, playing in the Spanish league in the 2005-06 season. Their best performances were two fifth places (2006 and 2007), and a semi-final in the 2007 Cup. In the 2007-08 season, the club withdrew from the competition.

External links

  Official website (currently not active)

Vielha
Sport in Lleida